Parliamentary Standards Commissioner may refer to:
Parliamentary Commissioner for Standards, in the United Kingdom Parliament
Scottish Parliamentary Standards Commissioner, in the Scottish Parliament